Alex Tan Zhixiang is an anti-government self-exiled Singaporean political dissident who sought Australian asylum. Tan was a former editor of Temasek Review, a now-defunct socio-political website that mainly produced articles on Singapore. With effect from 7 May 2020, his Facebook pages and website are officially banned in Singapore by the government in accordance with its fake news law, the Protection from Online Falsehoods and Manipulation Act (POFMA).

Activism 
Tan was an editor and one of the contributors and founders of the sociopolitical website The Real Singapore (TRS).

In January 2011, Tan reproduced a blog post on one of his websites, Temasek Revealed, which claimed that a full-time national serviceman had died after being shot during training. The post subsequently went viral. After the Ministry of Defence identified the post as a hoax and made a police report, a 19-year-old was arrested and charged for "transmitting false messages to the public", an offense under Singapore's telecommunications laws. Temasek Revealed was taken offline after the incident.

In July 2012, Tan sent SBS Transit an "expletive-filled rant in an e-mail" following a trip on one of its buses, which also propagated on local forums and social media sites. Following SBS Transit's complaints to the police, Tan published an apology on his blog which he said "maligned the good work SBS Transit Ltd has done for Singapore" which amounted to "blasphemous libel", in return for the company to stop pursuing the matter. The company acknowledged Tan's apology and offer to retract his previous statements.

On 6 February 2015, two editors of TRS, Ai Takagi and Robin Yang Kai Heng, were arrested under the Sedition Act for sedition charges. Tan moved to Australia soon after and The Real Singapore was shut down on 3 May 2015 by order of the Media Development Authority of Singapore. He subsequently started a new website called Straits Times Review, later changing its name to States Times Review. Law minister K Shanmugam had identified Straits Times Review as a publisher of fake news, citing the site's claim of a "near-zero turnout for former president SR Nathan’s funeral, and that kindergarten kids were forced to attend, in an attempt to paint him as an unpopular president". As a result, the Protection from Online Falsehoods and Manipulation Act (POFMA) was later passed after having gone through a select committee and deliberations in the 13th Parliament of Singapore.

Political career 
Tan contested under the Reform Party banner in 2011 as his party, the Singapore People's Party, was not interested in contesting in the Prime Minister's ward. As the main organizer of the two parties' joint walkabouts, Tan sought the Reform Party's help to contest in Ang Mo Kio GRC. The Reform Party then "loaned" Alex from the Singapore People's Party to contest in the ward.

In his maiden election speech, Tan underscored the lack of a social safety net for the elderly in Singapore and the influx of foreigners that has diluted Singaporeans' identity. Other campaigning issues he took on included the state of overcrowding, cost of living and the lack of transparency and accountability in the national retirement fund, the Central Provident Fund, and the national reserves. In one of his speeches, Tan questioned Dr Vivian Balakrishnan about statements Balakrishnan had made about the government wealth fund GIC's portfolio having returned to pre-crisis levels and claimed that no statistics or figures were provided to back up the statements.

In an open letter on the States Times Review, whereby website which is banned in Singapore, Tan challenged law minister K Shanmugam to stand against each other for election in a Single Member Constituency at the 2020 general elections. However, at present, Tan refused to return to Singapore to nominate himself on 30 June 2020 Nomination Day for the 10 July 2020 General Election, as he is on self-exile asylum in Australia.

Other activities
In July 2011, Wang Peng Fei, a People's Republic of China (PRC) student in Singapore made derogatory remarks against a Malay woman in his YouTube video post, and Tan lodged an official police report against him. The PRC student was subsequently expelled. Another PRC student, Sun Xu, who made a disparaging comment about Singaporeans (referring them as dogs), was also reported by Alex.

Controversies

Allegations of Singapore government's role in 1MDB scandal

On 6 November 2018, States Times Review published an article "Lee Hsien Loong becomes 1MDB's key investigation target", alleging that Malaysia had signed several unfair agreements with Singapore in exchange for Singapore banks’ assistance in laundering the Malaysian state fund 1Malaysia Development Berhad (1MDB) and implying that Singapore's Prime Minister Lee Hsien Loong is complicit in the money laundering on 1MDB. The Coverage of Malaysia subsequently published an article based on the content of this article, leading to the Monetary Authority of Singapore to file a police report against him for "impugning its integrity". K Shanmugam also called out the 'absurd' allegations and warned that such a method of propagating fake news has been used successfully in other parts of the world, and that when the information appears in mainstream media it gives "some credence" to the falsehoods.

The article also claimed that editor Ms Clare Rewcastle of Sarawak Report (SR) said in an interview with Malaysian media that Singapore, along with the United States and Switzerland, were key investigation targets in the 1MDB scandal. In response, SR called the interview "erroneous" and disowned the claim, saying that "SR (had) not given any such interview and (had) not written on this subject" and that "the article moreover (was) unclear in its direction and meaning."

On 9 November, the Info-communications Media Development Authority (IMDA) ordered States Times Review to take down the article or face blocked access by the Internet Service Providers (ISP) should it fail to do so by 5 p.m. that day. However, States Times Review refused to remove the alleged offending article on a Facebook post at 6 p.m. that day, with Tan even inviting Lee Hsien Loong to file a case with Australian authorities. As such, IMDA would direct ISPs to block States Times Review as it had not complied to the order by 5 p.m. that day. However Facebook had refused to take down the article from its platform as revealed by the Ministry of Law, which justified the necessity for legislation to defend Singapore from deliberate online falsehoods since "Facebook (could not) be relied upon to filter falsehoods or protect Singapore from a false information campaign."

Shortly after the blocked access to the offending article, Tan would announce that he would shut down States Times Review after the next Singaporean general election due to be held on 10 July 2020 and its Facebook page by 23 November 2018, saying that he would 'stop writing and continue life in Australia'. However, he also indicated that he would be offering help to a Toronto-based reader, a dual citizen of Canada and Singapore, to help start a new website Singapore Herald, whose server would be based in Burlington, Massachusetts.

POFMA correction notices and subsequent restricted access of Facebook pages in Singapore 
Since the inception of POFMA, Tan was served with numerous correction notices over false statements made through the various platforms he was managing. Alex Tan is the individual most frequently targeted by POFMA. Majority of these false statements were generally made with regards to COVID-19 pandemic in Singapore, including Singapore's Ministry of Health underreporting COVID-19 pandemic cases, quarantined foreign workers would not be paid their salaries, students and teachers contracting the virus in schools. Tan also made false statements alleging a Grab delivery rider being fined by authorities;  Ho Ching's salary with Temasek Holdings, and on POFMA itself, which drew the attention of Singapore's Attorney-General Chambers, which would assess if the allegations were a contempt of court.

As a result of the repeated correction notices being issued to Tan and ignored, Facebook has blocked access to two of pages ran by Tan in Singapore, after it was instructed to do so on 17 February 2020 by the POFMA Office. However this had not stopped Tan from continuing to post false statements as late as June 2020, and with at least four Facebook pages being similarly banned.

References

Year of birth missing (living people)
Living people
Singapore People's Party politicians
Singaporean people of Chinese descent